Günseli is a Turkish given name for females. The name is produced by using two Turkish words: Gün and Sel. In Turkish, "Gün" means "Day" and/or "Sun"; and "Sel" means "Flood" and/or "Stream". Therefore, it means "stream of sun" or "stream of daylight".

People
 Günseli Başar, former Turkish beauty contestant and Miss Europe 1952.

Fictional characters
 Günseli Ediz, one of the main characters in Tutunamayanlar.

Turkish feminine given names